Lukáš Bokroš (born September 9, 1982) is a Slovak former professional ice hockey left winger.

Bokroš played six games for HC Zlín of the Czech Extraliga during the 2006–07 season. He also played in the Tipsport Liga for HK Dukla Trenčín, HKM Zvolen, MHC Martin and MHK Dubnica as well as in the Ligue Magnus for Ours de Villard-de-Lans.

Bokroš played in the 2000 IIHF World U18 Championships for Slovakia.

References

External links

1982 births
Living people
PSG Berani Zlín players
HK Dubnica players
HK Dukla Trenčín players
HC Havířov players
HC Kometa Brno players
MHk 32 Liptovský Mikuláš players
MHC Martin players
Ours de Villard-de-Lans players
Slovak ice hockey left wingers
HKM Zvolen players
Slovak expatriate ice hockey players in the Czech Republic
Expatriate ice hockey players in France
Slovak expatriate sportspeople in France